Monstersestraat is a RandstadRail stop in The Hague, Netherlands.

History 
The station is a stop for lines 2 and 4 and is on the Loosduinseweg. Line 11 stops nearby on the Tripstraat.

RandstadRail services 
The following services currently call at Monstersestraat:

Tram Services

Connecting Tram Service

Gallery 

RandstadRail stations in The Hague